Broken Wings is a 1934 novel by F. J. Thwaites.

Plot
The novel is set in Australia's sheep country. Ron Burrell, the last son of a respected pioneer family, falls foul of a powerful financier and suffers many vicissitudes before regaining his place in society.

References

External links
Broken Wings at AustLit

1934 Australian novels
Novels set in Australia